His Last Bullet is a 1928 American silent Western film directed by Ben F. Wilson and starring Al Hoxie and Peggy O'Day.

Cast
 Al Hoxie as Tom Randall
 Peggy O'Day as Ethel Thompson
 Ben Wilson Jr. as Phil Randall
 Ellis Houston as Joe Corrigan
 Slim Parelda as Miller
 Ed La Niece as Jed Thompson
 Sunflash the Wonder Horse as Sunflash, Tom's Horse

References

External links
 

1928 films
1928 Western (genre) films
American black-and-white films
1920s English-language films
Films directed by Ben F. Wilson
Silent American Western (genre) films
1920s American films